Valle Viejo is a central department of Catamarca Province in Argentina.

Prehistory

The Valle Viejo region has been populated for at least 8,000 years. Around 1,000 years ago the area was settled by a population of farmers and hunters. The population created buildings, irrigation systems, and various fortifications.

External links

Valle Viejo webpage (Spanish)

Departments of Catamarca Province